McGreal is a surname. Notable people with the surname include:

Chris McGreal, British journalist
John McGreal (born 1972), English footballer